Nike Maria Mathilde Sellmar, (born 14 July 1995) is a Swedish singer. 
She won Idol 2022 on 25 November 2022 in Tele2 Arena. Her winner song was ”Anything You Say”.

Discography

Singles

References

Living people
1995 births
Idol (Swedish TV series) participants
Idol (Swedish TV series) winners

21st-century Swedish singers